The Finsbury Dispensary, more fully the Finsbury Dispensary for Administering Advice and Medicines to the Poor, was a charitable dispensary giving medical treatment to poor people in Finsbury, on the edge of the City of London.  It was founded in 1780 by a Quaker, one George Friend.  It operated from various premises during its existence in the 19th century, notably, between 1819 and 1838 it occupied a large, well-appointed house in St. John's Street, where it was sometimes called the New Finsbury Dispensary.

A number of well-known surgeons and physicians worked at the Finsbury Dispensary.  These include;
John Andree (appointed 1781)
William Charles Wells (appointed 1790)
Charles Aldis
Golding Bird (appointed 1836)
James Paget (appointed 1841)
Charles West (appointed 1841)

References

Organizations established in 1780
Charities based in London
Medical and health organisations based in London
Dispensaries in London